The Hammett acidity function (H0) is a measure of acidity that is used for very concentrated solutions of strong acids, including superacids. It was proposed by the physical organic chemist Louis Plack Hammett and is the best-known acidity function used to extend the measure of Brønsted–Lowry acidity beyond the dilute aqueous solutions for which the pH scale is useful.

In highly concentrated solutions, simple approximations such as the Henderson–Hasselbalch equation are no longer valid due to the variations of the activity coefficients. The Hammett acidity function is used in fields such as physical organic chemistry for the study of acid-catalyzed reactions, because some of these reactions use acids in very high concentrations, or even neat (pure).

Definition
The Hammett acidity function, H0, can replace the pH in concentrated solutions. It is defined using an equation analogous to the Henderson–Hasselbalch equation:

where log(x) is the common logarithm of x, and pKBH+ is −log(K) for the dissociation of BH+, which is the conjugate acid of a very weak base B, with a very negative pKBH+. In this way, it is rather as if the pH scale has been extended to very negative values. Hammett originally used a series of anilines with electron-withdrawing groups for the bases.

Hammett also pointed out the equivalent form

where  is the activity, and the γ are thermodynamic activity coefficients.  In dilute aqueous solution (pH 0–14) the predominant acid species is H3O+ and the activity coefficients are close to unity, so H0 is approximately equal to the pH. However, beyond this pH range, the effective hydrogen-ion activity changes much more rapidly than the concentration. This is often due to changes in the nature of the acid species; for example in concentrated sulfuric acid, the predominant acid species ("H+") is not H3O+ but rather H3SO4+, which is a much stronger acid. The value H0 = -12 for pure sulfuric acid must not be interpreted as pH = −12 (which would imply an impossibly high H3O+ concentration of 10+12 mol/L in ideal solution). Instead it means that the acid species present (H3SO4+) has a protonating ability equivalent to H3O+ at a fictitious (ideal) concentration of 1012 mol/L, as measured by its ability to protonate weak bases.

Although the Hammett acidity function is the best known acidity function, other acidity functions have been developed by authors such as Arnett, Cox, Katrizky, Yates, and Stevens.

Typical values
On this scale, pure H2SO4 (18.4 M) has a H0 value of −12, and pyrosulfuric acid has H0 ~ −15. Take note that the Hammett acidity function clearly avoids water in its equation. It is a generalization of the pH scale—in a dilute aqueous solution (where B is H2O), pH is very nearly equal to H0. By using a solvent-independent quantitative measure of acidity, the implications of the leveling effect are eliminated, and it becomes possible to directly compare the acidities of different substances (e.g. using pKa, HF is weaker than HCl or H2SO4 in water but stronger than HCl in glacial acetic acid.)

H0 for some concentrated acids:

 Helonium: −63
 Fluoroantimonic acid (1990): −23 < H0 < −28
 Magic acid (1974): −23
 Carborane superacids: H0 < −18.0
 Fluorosulfuric acid (1944): −15.1

Hydrogen fluoride: −15.1
Trifluoromethanesulfonic acid (1940): −15.1
Perchloric acid: −13
 Sulfurochloridic acid: -13.8; −12.78
 Sulfuric acid: −12.0

For mixtures (e.g., partly diluted acids in water), the acidity function depends on the composition of the mixture and has to be determined empirically. Graphs of H0 vs mole fraction can be found in the literature for many acids.

References

Acid–base chemistry
Physical organic chemistry